Chachoan Airport  is a high elevation airport serving Ambato (also known as San Juan de Ambato), capital of the Tungurahua Province in Ecuador.

The Ambato non-directional beacon (Ident: AMB) is located on the field. There is rising and mountainous terrain in all quadrants.

See also

Transport in Ecuador
List of airports in Ecuador

References

External links 
OpenStreetMap - Chachoan
OurAirports - Chachoan
SkyVector - Chachoan

Airports in Ecuador
Buildings and structures in Tungurahua Province